A geographer is a physical scientist, social scientist or humanist whose area of study is geography, the study of Earth's natural environment and human society, including how society and nature interacts. The Greek prefix "geo" means "earth" and the Greek suffix, "graphy," meaning "description," so a geographer is someone who studies the earth. The word "geography" is a Middle French word that is believed to have been first used in 1540.

Although geographers are historically known as people who make maps, map making is actually the field of study of cartography, a subset of geography. Geographers do not study only the details of the natural environment or human society, but they also study the reciprocal relationship between these two. For example, they study how the natural environment contributes to human society and how human society affects the natural environment.

In particular, physical geographers study the natural environment while human geographers study human society and culture. Some geographers are practitioners of GIS (geographic information system) and are often employed by local, state, and federal government agencies as well as in the private sector by environmental and engineering firms.

The paintings by Johannes Vermeer titled The Geographer and The Astronomer are both thought to represent the growing influence and rise in prominence of scientific enquiry in Europe at the time of their painting in 1668–69.

Areas of study 

There are three major fields of study, which are further subdivided:
 Human geography: including urban geography, cultural geography, economic geography, political geography, historical geography, marketing geography, health geography, and social geography.
 Physical geography: including geomorphology, hydrology, glaciology, biogeography, climatology, meteorology, pedology, oceanography, geodesy, and environmental geography.
 Regional geography: including atmosphere, biosphere, and lithosphere.

The National Geographic Society identifies five broad key themes for geographers:
 human-environment interaction
 location
 movement
 place
regions

Notable geographers

 Alexander von Humboldt (1769–1859) – published Cosmos and founder of the sub-field biogeography.
 Arnold Henry Guyot (1807–1884) – noted the structure of glaciers and advanced understanding in glacier motion, especially in fast ice flow.
 Carl O. Sauer (1889–1975) – cultural geographer.
 Carl Ritter (1779–1859) – occupied the first chair of geography at Berlin University.
 David Harvey (born 1935) – Marxist geographer and author of theories on spatial and urban geography, winner of the Vautrin Lud Prize.
 Doreen Massey (1944–2016) – scholar in the space and places of globalization and its pluralities; winner of the Vautrin Lud Prize.
 Edward Soja (1940–2015) – worked on regional development, planning and governance and coined the terms synekism and postmetropolis; winner of the Vautrin Lud Prize.
 Ellen Churchill Semple (1863–1932) – first female president of the American Association of Geographers.
 Eratosthenes ( 276–c. 195/194 BC) – calculated the size of the Earth.
 Ernest Burgess (1886–1966) – creator of the concentric zone model.
 Gerardus Mercator (1512–1594) – cartographer who produced the Mercator projection
 John Francon Williams (1854–1911) – author of The Geography of the Oceans.
 Karl Butzer (1934–2016) – German-American geographer, cultural ecologist and environmental archaeologist.
 Michael Frank Goodchild (born 1944) – GIS scholar and winner of the RGS founder's medal in 2003.
 Muhammad al-Idrisi (Arabic: أبو عبد الله محمد الإدريسي; Latin: Dreses) (1100–1165) – author of Nuzhatul Mushtaq.
 Nigel Thrift (born 1949) – originator of non-representational theory.
 Paul Vidal de La Blache (1845–1918) – founder of the French school of geopolitics, wrote the principles of human geography.
 Ptolemy (c. 100–c. 170) – compiled Greek and Roman knowledge into the book Geographia.
 Radhanath Sikdar (1813–1870) – calculated the height of Mount Everest.
 Roger Tomlinson (1933 – 2014) – the primary originator of modern geographic information systems. 
 Halford Mackinder (1861–1947) – co-founder of the London School of Economics, Geographical Association.
 Strabo (64/63 BC – c. AD 24) – wrote GeographicaGeographica, one of the first books outlining the study of geography.
 Waldo Tobler (1930-2018) – coined the first law of geography.
 Walter Christaller (1893–1969) – human geographer and inventor of central place theory.
 William Morris Davis (1850–1934) – father of American geography and developer of the cycle of erosion.
 Yi-Fu Tuan (1930-2022) – Chinese-American scholar credited with starting humanistic geography as a discipline.

Institutions and societies 
 American Association of Geographers
 American Geographical Society
 Anton Melik Geographical Institute (Slovenia)
 Gamma Theta Upsilon (international)
 Institute of Geographical Information Systems (Pakistan)
 International Geographical Union
 Karachi Geographical Society (Pakistan)
 National Geographic Society (US)
 Royal Canadian Geographical Society
 Royal Danish Geographical Society
 Royal Geographical Society (UK)
 Russian Geographical Society

See also 

Geographers on Film
Geography
Human geography
List of geographers
Outline of geography
Physical geography
Technical geography

References

Further reading 
 Steven Seegel.  Map Men: Transnational Lives and Deaths of Geographers in the Making of East Central Europe. University of Chicago Press, 2018. .

External links 
 

 
Science occupations
Social science occupations
Humanities occupations
Academic disciplines